form a significant immigrant community, with around 2800 living in the country, mostly belonging to the Nigerian Union in Japan which is divided into sub-unions based on states of origin. The vast majority of Nigerians arrived in Japan from the mid-1980s onwards.

Migration history
Nigerians and other West African migrants began coming to Japan in the mid-1980s as migrant workers. Legal migrants often enter via student visas, which allow them to work for a limited number of hours each week. As of 2017 Japan has significantly eased restrictions on skilled immigrants gaining permanent right-to-remain visas, making them a logical follow-on from student visas.

There are a number of organizations for Nigerian immigrants in Japan. The Nigerian Union in Japan, the oldest one, was founded in 1990. The Nigerian Union restarted twice, most recently in 2010. The Imo State Union, founded in 2002, replaced it to become the largest and most active, and has formally applied for non-profit status under Japanese law.

Business and employment
Some Nigerian migrants during the 1980s found work in factories. Later, after the end of the Japanese asset price bubble reduced opportunities for such work, they shifted into the night-life industry in Tokyo's entertainment districts such as Kabukichō or Roppongi, a line of employment with a high level of public visibility. Many of the bars in these areas were previously owned by Chinese or Koreans, but during a police crackdown in 2002, closed down; Nigerians took advantage of the resulting business vacuum to open their own bars, and hired their fellow countrymen as workers. Typically, Nigerians can be seen on the street as bouncers for bars. Many of the migrants working in this industry are in training for or have completed qualifications for professional positions such as engineering in institutions in their home countries or in Japan, but were unable to find any other kind of work in Japan suited to their level of education. There are many Nigerian organizations in Japan. Most are affiliated with the Houston, Texas USA-based Nigerian Union Diaspora (NUD), which is the umbrella Non-Governmental Organization (NGO) for the economic and political empowerment of the people of Nigerian descent outside Nigeria.

Interethnic relations
Nigerians have a very poor public image in Japan, with public reports of their activities often focused on crime and scams in bar districts to the exclusion of other aspects of the community.

In the media
From 2011-2016, American author Dreux Richard worked as The Japan Times' Special Correspondent covering the African community in Japan, publishing a series of feature articles on the Nigerian community in particular. The Japan Times' stories included coverage of civic organizations, cultural groups, religious institutions, the red light districts, marriage and family life, and claims of an emerging 'integration gap' separating well-integrated African immigrants from those struggling after arriving in Japan. Richard's book, 'Every Human Intention: Japan in the New Century' (2021), includes a lengthy account of the community's experiences.

Death of Gerald 'Sunny' Okafor

In June of 2019, long-term Igbo-Nigerian resident of Japan Gerald 'Sunny' Okafor starved to death during a hunger strike at the Omura Immigration Detention Center in Nagasaki. Although the government's investigation cleared the detention center of wrongdoing, subsequent investigations by journalists revealed severe administrative negligence by the detention center and Japan's immigration authorities, as well as a cover-up of this negligence carried out with the assistance of the Nigerian Embassy in Japan.

Sweeping immigration reforms proposed by the Japanese government for 2021 are based primarily on the government's controversial investigation of Mr. Okafor's death.

Notable people

 Ado Onaiwu, professional football player
 Andy Ologun, K-1 kickboxer and professional mixed martial artist
 Bobby Ologun, gaijin tarento
Louis Okoye, professional baseball player
 Powell Obinna Obi
 Solomon Sakuragawa

Notes

Bibliography
 
 
 
 Summary presentation available online: 
 
 
Richard, Dreux (2021), Every Human Intention: Japan in the New Century, Pantheon Books, ISBN 9781101871119

Further reading

External links
 Nigerian Union in Japan

 
Japan
Japan
Immigration to Japan